NBA blocks leader may refer to:
List of National Basketball Association annual blocks leaders
List of National Basketball Association career blocks leaders
List of National Basketball Association career playoff blocks leaders
List of National Basketball Association single-game blocks leaders